Ahmed Kaïd Stadium, or the Stade Ahmed-Kaïd, is a football stadium in Tiaret, Algeria. It has a capacity of 30,000, and it is the home stadium of local football team JSM Tiaret.

References

Football venues in Algeria
Buildings and structures in Tiaret Province